Australia and Italy have played each other in full tests at rugby union a total of nineteen matches, with the first eighteen won by Australia. Italy achieved their first victory in the fixture in the 2022 Autumn Internationals, some 39 years after the first match between the teams. Australia have met Italy once in Rugby World Cup play, losing 32-6 in Auckland in the 2011 Rugby World Cup. All other matches were Test Matches. 

In addition, Australia beat Italy twice in non-Test matches prior to 1983, in games in which Italy gave caps, but Australia, appearing as Australia XV, did not.

History
Australia first played Italy on their way home from European tours in the 1970s, though they were not given full international status. The first encounter was in 1973 when Australia ran up 59 points to 21, but the second was the closest ever, with Italy losing by a single point 16-17.
Officially the first test between the two countries was in 1983, following an Italian tour of Australia in 1981 in which the visitors acquitted themselves well against secondary opposition. They toured again in 1986 and played their first test match away from home.
Two years later the Italians were soundly beaten at the end of the 1988 Wallabies tour, but their next tour of Australia in 1994 saw a big improvement with all state matches won and an unlucky defeat in the Brisbane test match.
Since then results have generally been convincing wins to Australia, but the one in 2012 was close with Italy unlucky to lose by 3 points.
In November 2022 Italy won their first game against Australia 28-27 as part of the 2022 Autumn International.

World Cup History
In 2011 they met for the first time in a World Cup match at the group stage in Auckland with Australia starting their campaign towards the Semi-finals with a 32–6 win.

Summary
Note: Summary below reflects test results by both teams.

Overall

Records
Note: Date shown in brackets indicates when the record was or last set.

Results

XV Results
Below is a list of matches that Italy has awarded matches test match status by virtue of awarding caps, but Australia did not award caps.

List of series

References

External links

Australia national rugby union team matches
Italy national rugby union team matches
rugby union